Aïmane El Gueribi (born 16 January 1982) is a French semi-professional footballer who currently plays for Championnat de France amateur 2 side Thouars Foot 79. He plays as a midfielder. He played 19 matches in Ligue 2 for Chamois Niortais between 2003 and 2005.

External links
Aimane El Gueribi profile at chamoisfc79.fr

1982 births
Living people
French footballers
Association football midfielders
Chamois Niortais F.C. players
Ligue 2 players
Les Herbiers VF players
Thouars Foot 79 players
CS Avion players